Thomas James Creamer (May 26, 1843 – August 4, 1914) was an American lawyer and politician from New York who served two non-consecutive terms in the U.S. House of Representatives from 1873 to 1875, and from 1901 to 1903

Life
Born near Lough Garadice, County Leitrim, Ireland, Creamer immigrated to the United States and took up his residence in New York City. He attended the public schools, and became a shipping clerk in a dry-goods house in 1860. Then he studied law, was admitted to the bar, and practiced.

Political career 
He was member of the New York State Assembly in 1865, 1866 (New York Co., 10th D.), and 1867 (New York Co., 14th D.).

He was a member of the New York State Senate from 1868 to 1871, sitting in the 91st, 92nd, 93rd and 94th New York State Legislatures.

He was a New York City Tax Commissioner for five years, and acted as counsel for State commissions to revise the tax laws.

Congress 
Creamer was elected as a Democrat to the 43rd United States Congress, holding office from March 4, 1873, to March 3, 1875.

He was again a member of the State Assembly (New York Co., 14th D.) in 1889.

Creamer was elected to the 57th United States Congress, holding office from March 4, 1901, to March 3, 1903.

Later career and death 
Afterwards he resumed the practice of law in New York City, and died there August 4, 1914. He was interred in Green-Wood Cemetery.

References

1843 births
1914 deaths
New York (state) lawyers
Politicians from New York City
Irish emigrants to the United States (before 1923)
Democratic Party members of the New York State Assembly
Democratic Party New York (state) state senators
Burials at Green-Wood Cemetery
Politicians from County Leitrim
People from County Leitrim
Democratic Party members of the United States House of Representatives from New York (state)
19th-century American politicians
Lawyers from New York City
19th-century American lawyers